Arpaïs Du Bois (born 1973) is a Belgian drawer and painter. She lives and works in Antwerp, Belgium.

Work
Her works on paper in diary-like books form a significant portion of her artwork. Utilizing word and image associations are characteristic of Du Bois's work, as is the use of language.
These diaries, consisting of refined forms and scattered phrases, carefully positioned on otherwise empty grounds, have designated her public output, generally providing the content for her exhibitions in the form of pages torn from the notebooks arranged in novel constellations. These constellations have a high level of poetic strength as well as a striking fragility.

She formulates her (pre)occupation as a fight against forgetting, against oblivion. Her developed system of noting down what many overlook, of commenting so-called trivialities, by bending the bow between image and the written word has made her a fierce observer and commentator of the small systems in which we live, as well as the big wide world in which we attempt to make our small systems work.

She has three published books by Toohcsmi, Uitgevers, two books with Lannoo Publishers: one collaboration book with Japanese photographer Masao Yamamoto and one pure textual book.

She started a new collaboration with Hannibal Publishing in 2016.
Arpaïs Du Bois has been working on a daily blog since 2008 called "Instant de jour et dessin d'un soir", which is a daily posted photograph combined with a daily drawing.

Reception
Concerning Du Bois's artwork, Roger Pierre Turine has stated, "Between dreams, pains, fears and passing euphoria, they are witness drawings and crutches to the artist whenever she doubts." Anne-Marie Poels remarked, "Du Bois sees, thinks, feels, hears and lets the result of this flow onto paper".

Bibliography
Bundel Lichamen, Toohcsmi, 2001
Histoire, Imschoot, 2004
Des illusions virgule, Toohcsmi, 2005
Where We Met, Lannoo Publishers, 2011,
Petit livre qui ne tient pas debout, Lannoo Publishers, 2013,
Tout droit vers la fin en sifflotant, Hannibal Publishing, 2016,
Ma belle saison chez Vincent, gallery 51, 2017,

See also
List of Belgian painters

References

1973 births
Living people
20th-century Belgian women artists
21st-century Belgian women artists
Artists from Antwerp
Belgian women painters